December Wolves are an American, Wilmington, Massachusetts-based black metal band, which was formed in 1993. Their first demo appeared in 1994. So far December Wolves has released three albums. On newer material the group goes in a more experimental/industrial 'post-black' direction. They are currently working on new material.

Discography

Notes
Note A Due to the latest information, as edited by one of the current bandmembers, the present lineup is now clear.

References

External links
 BNR Metal Pages -- December Wolves
 December Wolves - Encyclopaedia Metallum: The Metal Archives

American black metal musical groups
Musical groups established in 1993
Earache Records artists
Heavy metal musical groups from Massachusetts
1993 establishments in Massachusetts